Fojnica is a town and municipality located in Central Bosnia Canton of the Federation of Bosnia and Herzegovina, an entity of Bosnia and Herzegovina. It is located west of the capital Sarajevo, in the valley of the Fojnička River, tributary of the river Bosna. Fojnica is a small town in central Bosnia and is also a balneological resort.

Cultural sites in Fojnica include the Holy Spirit Franciscan Monastery which houses an important part of the nation's cultural heritage maintained by the Franciscan Province of Bosna Srebrena.

The Franciscan monastery in Fojnica has a library of philosophical and theological works printed from the 16th to the 19th centuries, with some dating back to 1481. The monastery is currently under renovation.

Queen Catherine of Bosnia sought refuge from the Ottomans in Kozograd, royal summer-residence in the mountains near Fojnica at the time, before making her way to Rome.

Fojnica also has a spa center with thermal water Reumal Fojnica. The Prokoško Lake is located in the west of the municipality.

Settlements

Demographics

1971

total: 12,829
Bosniaks - 6,473 (50.45%)
Croats - 5,948 (46.36%)
Serbs - 223 (1.73%)
Yugoslavs - 85 (0.66%)
others  - 100 (0.80%)

1981

total: 15,045
Bosniaks - 7,637 (50.76%)
Croats - 6,432 (42.75%)
Serbs - 422 (2.80%)
Yugoslavs - 392 (2.60%)
others - 162 (1.09%)

1991

total: 16,296

Bosniaks - 8,024 (49.23%)
Croats - 6,623 (40.64%)
Serbs - 157 (0.96%)
Yugoslavs - 407 (2.49%)
others - 1,085 (6.68%)

2013 Census 

Page text.

References

 Official results from the book: Ethnic composition of Bosnia-Herzegovina population, by municipalities and settlements, 1991. census, Zavod za statistiku Bosne i Hercegovine - Bilten no.234, Sarajevo 1991.

External links

 Municipal website
 Tragovima bosanskog kraljevstva  - Tourist route for medieval Bosnia (English)
 Trail of the Bosnian Kingdom - Cultural Tourism in Tesanj

Populated places in Fojnica
Cities and towns in the Federation of Bosnia and Herzegovina